Beatus, meaning blessed in Medieval Latin, may mean:

One who has been beatified, the stage before being declared a saint

Biblical
The Commentary on the Apocalypse, (i.e. Book of Revelation), especially in illuminated manuscript form, written by Saint Beatus of Liébana
Beatus initial, the B of "Beatus vir..." ("Blessed is the man..."), the start of Psalm 1 in Latin, usually given the most elaborate decoration in an illuminated psalter
Beatus vir (from Psalm 112) is the title of many compositions including :
Beatus vir (1641) from Monteverdi's Selva morale e spirituale
Beatus vir, ZWV 75, 76, et 77, by Jan Dismas Zelenka
Beatus vir, RV597 et RV598, by Vivaldi
Beatus vir, MH 410, MH 398, by Michael Haydn
Beatus Vir (Górecki), opus 38 (1979), by Górecki
Beatus vir, Seibel 26, 27, and 28 by Johann David Heinichen

People
Beatus of Lungern or Saint Beatus of Beatenberg or Thun (died 122), semi-legendary figure who is considered the saint of Switzerland
Saint Beatus, Bishop of Amiens, France in the 5th century
Saint Beatus of Liébana ( – ), Spanish monk in San Martin de Turieno in Liebana, known for his Commentary on the Apocalypse
Beatus of Vendôme, semi-legendary saint of Vendôme
Beatus Rhenanus (Beatus Bild; 1485–1547), German humanist, religious reformer and classical scholar

Other uses
"Beatus", a song by Serj Tankian from Imperfect Harmonies

See also

 
 
 Beata (disambiguation)
 Beat (disambiguation)